NHL Live is a television show on NBC Sports Network. The program airs after every National Hockey League game the network televises as part of NHL on NBC. The postgame show was initially known as Hockey Central, airing from their Stamford, Connecticut studios.

History
Hockey Central first aired on October 5, 2005.  Given the limited time to prepare the studio after OLN won the broadcasting rights of the NHL in the summer of 2005, the first set was extremely spartan. This served as the temporary home to Hockey Central until a permanent set could be built midway through the first season. The show is hosted by Bill Patrick and a rotating panel of analysts as they break down highlights of other games, show special features on NHL players, and debate key issues in the NHL. The format is similar to TNT's Inside the NBA. Sometimes, VERSUS airs a pre-game edition of the show, usually prior to a double-header. The show originally did not air after double-headers, instead it usually took place between games, but starting with the 2007–08 season, aired both in between and after doubleheaders, unless the early game goes to overtime. It is also known as the "Hockey Central Post Game Report" or just "Hockey Central".

The show was sponsored by eSurance during the 2006–07 season, and is now sponsored by Bud Light.

Hockey Central was first broadcast in HD on October 3, 2007.

Location
Hockey Central is recorded live from Versus' Stamford, Connecticut studios. At times, the studio has gone on location for special events, usually the Stanley Cup Finals. VERSUS' on location studio shows have aired from:

Joe Louis Arena, Detroit, Michigan: February 12, 2006
RBC Center, Raleigh, North Carolina: June 5, 2006; June 7, 2006
American Airlines Center, Dallas, Texas: January 24, 2007
Honda Center, Anaheim, California: May 28, 2007 and May 30, 2007.
Joe Louis Arena, Detroit, Michigan: May 24, 2008 and May 26, 2008.
Mellon Arena, Pittsburgh, Pennsylvania: June 2, 2009 and June 4, 2009
Wachovia Center, Philadelphia, Pennsylvania: June 2, 2010 and June 4, 2010

Personalities

Current

Studio host
 Liam McHugh: Lead studio host (2010–2021)
 Kathryn Tappen: Lead studio host (2014–2021)
 Paul Burmeister: Stanley Cup Playoffs studio host and Stanley Cup Finals stadium host (2016–2021)

Studio analysts
 Keith Jones: Lead studio analyst (2005–2021); also color commentator for NBC Sports Philadelphia (Philadelphia Flyers broadcasts)
 Patrick Sharp: Lead studio analyst (2019–2021)
 Anson Carter: Studio analyst (2012–2021); "Inside the Glass" reporter (2015)
 Brian Boucher: "Inside the Glass" reporter/studio analyst (2015–2021)
 Mike Johnson: color commentator/studio analyst (2017–2021); also color commentator for TSN Hockey
 Bob McKenzie: NHL insider (2014–2021); also insider for TSN Hockey
 Darren Dreger: NHL insider (2014–2021); also insider for TSN Hockey
 Ben Lovejoy: studio analyst (2020–2021)
 Scott Hartnell: guest studio analyst (2020–2021); also back-up color commentator for NBC Sports Philadelphia (Philadelphia Flyers broadcasts)
 Mike Babcock: guest studio analyst (2021)
 Ryan Callahan: guest studio analyst (2021)
 Dominic Moore: guest studio analyst and color commentator (2021)

Former
 Bill Clement: Lead studio host (2005–2007)
 Bill Patrick: Lead studio host (2007–2010)
 Mark Messier: Studio analyst (2006-2008)
 Pierre McGuire: Lead studio analyst (2005–2006)
 Mike Milbury: Lead studio analyst/"Inside the Glass" reporter (2008–present), substitute lead color commentator (2017–2021)
 Neil Smith; Lead studio analyst (2005–2006)
 P.J. Stock: Studio analyst (2005)
 Al Trautwig: Studio host (2005–2007)
 Jack Edwards: Studio host (2005–2007)
 Brian Engblom: Occasional Studio analyst (2005–06), Lead studio analyst (2006–2011)
 Darren McCarty: Lead studio analyst (2009–2011)
 Mike Keenan: Guest studio analyst (2009–2011)
 John Stevens: Guest studio analyst (2010)
 Jeremy Roenick: Studio analyst (2010–2019), lead NHL outdoor games reporter (2014–2019)

Playoffs
 Rick DiPietro Studio analyst (2006 & 2008 Stanley Cup Playoffs)
 Tom Fitzgerald Studio analyst (2006 Stanley Cup Playoffs)
 Mike Knuble Studio analyst (2006 Stanley Cup Playoffs)
 Ken Hitchcock Studio analyst (2007 Stanley Cup Playoffs)
 Peter Laviolette Studio analyst (2007 Stanley Cup Playoffs)
 Ted Nolan Studio analyst (2007 Stanley Cup Playoffs, 2009)
 Aaron Ward Studio analyst (2007 Stanley Cup Playoffs)
 Doug Weight Studio analyst (2007 Stanley Cup Playoffs)
 Manny Legacé Studio analyst (2008 Stanley Cup Playoffs)

Breakdown of studio team

2005–06

Regular season
During the 2005–06 NHL season, Bill Clement was named the lead studio host while former NHL forward Keith Jones and then-former NHL GM Neil Smith were the regular analysts on the show. On Monday nights, Pierre McGuire join them. Sometimes, Smith or McGuire would be on assignment for TSN, and a rotating cast of analysts will replace them, including Brian Engblom, P. J. Stock, and Eddie Olczyk (later in the season when he was fired by the Pittsburgh Penguins).

Postseason
During the playoffs, they brought in current NHL players Flyers' Mike Knuble, the Islanders' Rick DiPietro, and the Bruins' Tom Fitzgerald. Lastly, hockey great Mark Messier was a guest analyst during the 2006 Stanley Cup Finals.

2006–07
For the 2006–07 season, Jones and Engblom were brought back as regulars, while Clement remained as the primary host. The network also brought back Olczyk, but he was not used as often due to his commitments to the Chicago Blackhawks. Pierre McGuire and Neil Smith did not return to the network.

Postseason
During the playoffs, they brought in current NHL players Blues' Doug Weight and the Bruins' Aaron Ward. They also brought in current and former NHL head coaches; the Blue Jackets' Ken Hitchcock and the Hurricanes' Peter Laviolette. The Islanders' Ted Nolan join the studio after his team was eliminated in the first round by the Buffalo Sabres. Lastly, hockey great Mark Messier was a guest analyst during the 2007 Stanley Cup Finals.

2007–08
Clement left the network prior to the 2007–08 season, and former SportsCenter host and USA Network PGA Tour play-by-play man Bill Patrick replaced him. Both Jones and Engblom are returned to the show, which moved to Versus' new in-house, HD studio in Connecticut.

Postseason
During the playoffs, Rick DiPietro of the New York Islanders rejoin the studio team after his team failed to qualify for the playoffs. They also brought in Manny Legacé, the former Detroit Red Wings' goaltender. Lastly, hockey great Mark Messier was a guest analyst during the 2008 Stanley Cup Finals.

See also
 Hockey Central (Sportsnet)

National Hockey League on television
2005 American television series debuts
2021 American television series endings
2010s American television series
2020s American television series

NBCSN shows